Green Mace, also known as the QF 127/58 SBT X1, was a British heavy anti-aircraft gun of the 1950s. It used a variety of techniques to improve the firing rate of the gun, and the velocity of its projectiles. Although a prototype was built and survives today, it was rendered obsolete by the development of the guided surface-to-air missile and thus never entered production.

History
Green Mace was the Rainbow Code assigned to the QF 127/58 SBT X1 during its development. The original specifications were for a 5-inch gun with water-cooled barrel, firing folding-fin discarding sabot dart projectiles. Two rotary magazines, each holding 14 rounds, would allow for a high rate of fire on the order of 75 rounds per minute (RPM).

The gun was developed by Vickers under the direction of the Royal Armaments Research and Development Establishment at Fort Halstead. It demonstrated a firing rate as high as 96 rounds per minute, about six times that of the famous 8.8 cm Flak 18/36/37/41.

Development
A proof of concept prototype was built with a 4inch (102mm) barrel, but otherwise was as intended. It was mostly automatic, and could be operated by a single person sitting in a covered control cabin on the right hand side of the vehicle. However, the enormous power and ammunition requirements for the piece resulted in it having to have two trailers in support—one for power, and one for ammunition—and a crew with a small crane in order to reload the two ammunition drums. With only 28 rounds available in the drums, and an 80–90 rounds/minute fire rate, reloading was a frequent task. It took a crew between ten and fifteen minutes to reload.

With the advent of guided missiles, and the transfer of responsibility for ground-based, anti-aircraft defence of UK airspace from the British Army to the Royal Air Force, the project was cancelled in 1957.

Other versions 

Some sources suggest that a naval version of Green Mace was planned as a new dual purpose gun for the Royal Navy's destroyers, and a twin version of the same gun intended for cruisers reached the design stage, but neither went any further, and they were cancelled outright in 1957.

Original work was done on two other projects: Longhand and Ratefixer. Both were of smaller calibre than Green Mace but were designed to try to increase the rate of fire and calibre used. Similar concepts were also said to be used in the Red Queen gun, which was essentially a medium-weight version of Green Mace.

See also
Bloodhound (missile)
Thunderbird (missile)

Weapons of comparable role, performance and era
130 mm air defense gun KS-30, early 1950s Soviet weapon
AK-130, 1970s Soviet naval automatic twin gun with rate of fire about the same as Green Mace
  105mm SFAC, a French anti-aircraft gun developed in late 1940s and abandoned in 1950s
Lvakan 4501, a Swedish 12cm anti-aircraft gun developed by Bofors in the 1950s, later changed into a naval gun, TAK120

References 

Anti-aircraft guns of the United Kingdom
Cold War artillery of the United Kingdom
Anti-aircraft guns of the Cold War
127 mm artillery